WPPL (103.9 FM) is a radio station broadcasting a country music format. Licensed to Blue Ridge, Georgia, United States. The station is currently owned by Fannin County Broadcasting Co., Inc. and features programming from AP Radio and Dial Global.

References

External links

PPL
Radio stations established in 1991